The Mott Baronetcy, of Ditchling in the County of Sussex, is a title in the Baronetage of the United Kingdom. It was created on 25 June 1930 for the noted engineer Basil Mott.

Mott baronets, of Ditchling (1930)
Sir Basil Mott, 1st Baronet (1859–1938)
Sir Adrian Spear Mott, 2nd Baronet (1889–1964) a captain in the army in World War I, he qualified as a barrister and was in business as a publisher
Sir John Harmar Mott, 3rd Baronet (1922–2015)
Sir David Hugh Mott, 4th Baronet (born 1952)

References

Kidd, Charles & Williamson, David (editors). Debrett's Peerage and Baronetage (1990 edition). New York: St Martin's Press, 1990.

External links
Mott, Sir Adrian Spear (1889–1964) 2nd Baronet Publisher; The National Archives

Mott